Novosilsky District is an administrative and municipal district (raion), one of the twenty-four in Oryol Oblast, Russia. It is located in the northeast of the oblast. Its administrative center is the town of Novosil. Population: 8,561 (2010 Census);  The population of Novosil accounts for 42.7% of the district's total population.

References

Notes

Sources

Districts of Oryol Oblast